Ferguson Lake is a lake of Cape Breton Regional Municipality located in Nova Scotia, Canada.

See also
List of lakes in Nova Scotia

References
 Canadian Geographical Names Database

Lakes of Nova Scotia